Boris Becker defeated Jim Courier in the final, 6–4, 6–3, 7–5 to win the singles tennis title at the 1992 ATP Tour World Championships.

Pete Sampras was the defending champion, but was defeated by Courier in the semifinals.

Seeds

Draw

Finals

Rod Laver group
Standings are determined by: 1. number of wins; 2. number of matches; 3. in two-players-ties, head-to-head records; 4. in three-players-ties, percentage of sets won, or of games won; 5. steering-committee decision.

Ken Rosewall group
Standings are determined by: 1. number of wins; 2. number of matches; 3. in two-players-ties, head-to-head records; 4. in three-players-ties, percentage of sets won, or of games won; 5. steering-committee decision.

See also
 ATP World Tour Finals appearances

References
 ATP Tour World Championships Singles Draw

Singles
Tennis tournaments in Germany
1992 in German tennis
Sports competitions in Frankfurt